The Montague Burton Professorship of International Relations is a named chair at the University of Oxford and the London School of Economics and Political Science. Created by the endowment of Montague Burton in UK universities, the Oxford chair was established in 1930 and is associated with a Fellowship of Balliol College, Oxford, while the chair at LSE was established in 1936.

List of Montague Burton Professors of International Relations at Oxford 

 1930–1944 Sir Alfred Zimmern
 1944–1947 Sir Llewellyn Woodward
 1948–1971 Agnes Headlam-Morley
 1972–1976 Alastair Buchan
 1977–1985 Hedley Bull
 1986–2007 Sir Adam Roberts
 2008– Andrew Hurrell

List of Montague Burton Professors of International Relations at LSE 

In 1919, Ernest Cassel endowed a £500,000 educational fund which was in part used to establish the Sir Ernest Cassel Professor of International Relations at the University of London. During Manning's tenure in 1936, the chair was re-endowed and renamed the Montague Burton Professorship of International Relations.

 1924–1929 Philip Noel-Baker
 1930–1962 Charles Manning
 1962–1978 Geoffrey Goodwin
 1978–1988 Susan Strange
 1989–1990 R J Vincent
 1991–2004 Christopher J. Hill
 2005–2008 Fred Halliday
 2009–2011 Barry Buzan
 2012–2017 Iver B. Neumann

See also 
Elizabeth Wiskemann

References

Selected reading 

 Alderson, Kai and Andrew Hurrell, Hedley Bull On International Society (2003).
 Markwell, Don (1986), 'Sir Alfred Zimmern Revisited: Fifty Years On', Review of International Studies.
 Markwell, Donald, 'Sir Alfred Eckhard Zimmern', Oxford Dictionary of National Biography, 2004. 
 Miller, J.D.B. and R.J. Vincent (eds), Order and Violence: Hedley Bull and International Relations (1990).
 Adam Roberts, 'Professing International Relations at Oxford', Oxford Magazine, Oxford, Noughth Week, Hilary Term 2008, pp. 10–12.
 Vigezzi, Brunello, The British Committee on the Theory of International Politics (2005)

Burton
Professorships in international relations
Burton
Balliol College, Oxford
London School of Economics
Lists of people associated with the University of Oxford